Robert Tischler is an American television writer, audio engineer and television producer. Tischler engineered the National Lampoon's first comedy album and with Michael O'Donoghue co-created and produced the National Lampoon Radio Hour. A friend of John Belushi's since the Radio Hour days, Tischler produced four Blues Brothers albums, the first of which, Briefcase Full of Blues, reached No. 1 on the Billboard 200 and went double platinum.

Tischler joined NBC's Saturday Night Live television program when Dick Ebersol took creative control in 1981 and became head writer of SNL for four seasons, leaving the show in 1985. Tischler produced David Brenner's late-night talk show Nightlife during the 1986-'87 season and has since written for and produced a number of television series, including What's Alan Watching?, Empty Nest, Something So Right and Boy Meets World.

Career
Bob Tischler was making radio spots for movie studios when, after hiring improvisational actor Christopher Guest as voice talent, Guest and Tischler became friends. "Chris got me into show business," Tischler later recalled. When Guest became involved with National Lampoon's 1972 Radio Dinner album, he called on Tischler to help. Tischler co-produced the record with Lampoon magazine writers Tony Hendra and Michael O'Donoghue.

References

External links

National Lampoon people
American television writers
American male television writers
American comedy writers
Living people
Year of birth missing (living people)